Jadkal is a village in Byndoor Taluk, Udupi district, Karnataka, India. As per the census of India 2011, the Jadkal Grama Panchayat, which consists of the two villages of Jadkal and Mudoor, had a total population of 7000.
The livelihood of the people in the village mainly depends on agriculture and fishing. The nearest railway stations is Mookambika Road Byndoor railway station.

The village has several primary and middle schools, and the Sacred Heart Convent School. Most of the teaching is done in either English or Kannada. This village has one National Bank and two Co-Operative societies.

See also
 Byndoor
 Udupi
 Kundapura

References

Villages in Udupi district